Ida Julia Pollock ( Crowe; 12 April 1908 – 3 December 2013) was a British writer of several short-stories and over 125 romance novels that were published under her married name, Ida Pollock, and under a number of different pseudonyms: Joan M. Allen; Susan Barrie, Pamela Kent, Averil Ives, Anita Charles, Barbara Rowan, Jane Beaufort, Rose Burghley, Mary Whistler and Marguerite Bell. She has sold millions of copies over her 90-year career. She has been referred to as the "world's oldest novelist" who was still active at 105 and continued writing until her death. On the occasion of her 105th birthday, Pollock was appointed honorary vice-president of the Romantic Novelists' Association, having been one of its founding members.

Ida and her husband, Lt Colonel Hugh Alexander Pollock, DSO (1888–1971), a veteran of war and Winston Churchill's collaborator and editor, had a daughter, Rosemary Pollock, who is also a romance writer. Ida's autobiography, Starlight, published in 2009 at 100 years, tells the story of the start of her career, her marriage, and the relation of her husband with his ex-wife Enid Blyton. She was also an oil painter, who was selected for inclusion in a national exhibition in 2004, at the age of 96.

Biography

First years
Born Ida Julia Crowe on 12 April 1908 in Lewisham, Kent, England, she was the daughter of Fanny Osborn, whose father was an architect in Victorian London, and her husband Arthur Crowe, but Pollock claimed to be illegitimate. Still unmarried, her mother began an affair with a supposed Russian duke, but, after her parents' death, her mother married Arthur Crowe, an old widower with a distant connection to Lord Nelson. A year or so later her mother resumed her affair with her Russian lover and became pregnant, but her daughter obtained her husband's surname. Her mother lived alone when Pollock was born, and she narrowly escaped being smothered with a pillow by the nurse who attended her birth. Her mother had a difficult time raising her and she was almost adopted by a rich uncle. Encouraged by her mother, she began to write while still at school. At 14, she published her first thriller, The Hills of Raven's Haunt.

At age 20, she was living with her mother in Hastings and already had several stories in major magazines and short novels in print. She visited George Newnes's office in London, to sell her first full-length manuscript; Palanquins and Coloured Lanterns, a novel set in 1920s Shanghai. Six months later, she discovered they had mislaid it. After they found it, she returned to London to meet one of its editors, the 39-year-old Hugh Alexander Pollock (1888–1971), a distinguished veteran of World War I. Hugh had been married since 1924 to his second wife, the popular children's writer Enid Blyton, and was divorced from his first wife, Marion Atkinson, with whom he had two sons, William Cecil Alexander (1914–16) and Edward Alistair (1915–69). George Newnes bought her manuscript and contracted with her to write two more novels. She became a full-time writer in the 1930s, writing short stories under pseudonyms. Ida decided to travel alone to Morocco, after suffering a mental breakdown.

World War II years and family
During World War II, Ida worked at a hostel for girls in London during the Blitz; at this time Hugh, who had left publishing to join the Army, was Commandant of a school for Home Guard officers. Hugh had two daughters with Enid Blyton, Gillian Mary (later Baverstock; 1931–2007) and Imogen Mary (later Smallwood; born 1935), but his marriage had difficulties and his wife began a series of affairs. He offered Ida a post as civilian secretary at the Army Training Centre in the Surrey Hills. During a bungled firearms training session on a firing range, Hugh was hit by shrapnel and Ida contacted Enid, who declined to visit her husband because she was busy and hated hospitals.

In 1941, Enid met Kenneth Fraser Darrell Waters, a London surgeon with whom she began another relationship, and the marriage had broken down. In May 1942, while Ida was visiting her mother's home in Hastings a bomb destroyed the house. She escaped unhurt, but her mother was in hospital for two weeks. Hugh paid for Ida to stay at Claridges and he said he was divorcing his wife. To get a quick divorce, Hugh blamed himself for adultery at divorce petition. On 26 October 1943 Ida and Hugh were married at London's Guildhall Register Office, six days after Enid's marriage to Darrell Waters. In 1944 they had a daughter Rosemary Pollock who has also become a romance writer. Enid changed the names of their daughters and Hugh did not see them again, although Enid had promised access as part of his taking the blame for the divorce.

Romance writing career
After World War II, George Newnes, Hugh's old firm, decided not to work with him anymore. They also represented Enid Blyton and were not willing to let her go. After this the marriage experienced financial problems and, in 1950, Hugh had to declare bankruptcy while he struggled with alcoholism. Ida decided to write popular contemporary romances and sold her first novel to Mills & Boon in 1952. Being in print with several major international publishers at the same time, she decided to use multiple pseudonyms. In the 1950s she wrote as Susan Barrie, Pamela Kent, Rose Burghley, and Mary Whistler to Mills & Boon; as Averil Ives and Barbara Rowan to Ward Lock; as Anita Charles to Wright & Brown; and as Jane Beaufort to Collins. In 1964, she published under her married name, Ida Pollock, her first historical novel, The Gentle Masquerade, and after the success of it, Mills and Boon's "Masquerade" series of historical romances was launched. Under her last pseudonym, Marguerite Bell, she also wrote historical romances. Most of her novels have been reprinted by Mills & Boon (or Harlequin in the United States).

During her marriage she travelled widely and lived in many parts of England. It was their daughter's asthma that brought the Pollocks to Cornwall. They also lived in Ireland, France, Italy, Malta and Switzerland, where they successfully obtained a lasting cure for Rosemary's debilitating condition. Hugh died on 8 November 1971 in Malta, where he is buried in the British military cemetery. After her husband's death, Pollock returned with her daughter to England and they lived for several years in Wiltshire, before moving to Lanreath in 1986. In the 1970s she slowed the rhythm of publication, but continued to write. Besides romances, she published – as Barbara Rowan – a suspense novel, and her novel, A Distant Drum (2005), is based around the Battle of Waterloo. She has been referred to as the "world's oldest novelist" who was still active at 105. After her death, her medieval story: Sir Faintheart was published in 2015, and there are still at least two unpublished Regency romances pending publication, including The Runaway.  Today many of her old novels are being reedited.

Later years
In addition to writing, Ida constructed model houses, usually scale miniatures of Georgian or Tudor buildings. She was also an oil painter, who was selected for inclusion in a national exhibition in 2004, at the age of 96. But her sight deteriorated and she returned to writing.

After her 100th birthday, her autobiography, Starlight, was published on 15 November 2009, and she tells the story of the start of her career, her marriage, and the relation of her husband with his ex-wife Enid Blyton.

In 1960 she was a founding member of the Romantic Novelists' Association, and in 2010 she helped in its 50th anniversary. On the occasion of her 105th birthday, she was appointed its honorary vice-president.

She died 3 December 2013, aged 105.

Bibliography

As Ida Crowe

Single novels
The Hills of Raven's Haunt, 1922

As Joan M. Allen

Single novels
Palanquins and coloured lanterns, 1930?
Her Chinese Captor, 1935
Indian Love, 1935

As Susan Barrie

Single novels
Mistress of Brown Furrows, 1952
Gates of Dawn, 1954
Marry a Stranger, 1954
Carpet of dreams, 1955
Hotel Stardust = Hotel at Treloan, 1955
Dear Tiberius = Nurse Nolan, 1956
So Dear to my Heart, 1956
The House of the Laird, 1956
Air Ticket, 1957
Four Roads to Windrush, 1957
Heart Specialist, 1958
Stars of San Cecilio, 1958
The wings of the morning, 1960
Bride in Waiting, 1961
Moon at the Full, 1961
Royal Purple, 1962
A Case of Heart Trouble, 1963
Mountain Magic, 1964
Castle Thunderbird, 1965
No Just Cause, 1965
Master of Melincourt, 1966
Rose in the Bud, 1966
The Quiet Heart, 1966
Accidental Bride, 1967
Victoria and the Nightingale, 1967
Wild Sonata, 1968
The Marriage Wheel, 1968/12
Night of the Singing Birds, 1970/04

Omnibus collections
Marry A Stranger / Rose in the Bud / Marriage Wheel, 1976
House of the Laird / A Case of Heart Trouble / The Quiet Heart, 1976
Return to Tremarth / Night of the Singing Birds / Bride in Waiting, 1980

Anthologies in collaboration
Golden Harlequin Library Vol. X: The Wild Land Isobel Chance / Surgeon for Tonight / Four Roads to Windrush (1971) (with Isobel Chace by Elizabeth Houghton)
Golden Harlequin Library Vol. XVII: No Silver Spoon / Nurse Nolan / The Time and the Place (1971) (with Jane Arbor and Essie Summers)
Golden Harlequin Library Vol. XXI: The Doctor's Daughters / Gates of Dawn / The Gift at Snowy River (1972) (with Anne Weale and Joyce Dingwell)
Children's Nurse / Heart Specialist / Child Friday (1972) (Sara Seale and Kathryn Blair)
Romance Treasury (1975) (with Karin Mutch and Yvonne Whittal)
Harlequin Classic Library (1980) (with Elizabeth Hoy, Alex Stuart, Mary Burchell, Juliet Shore, Jean S. MacLeod, Elizabeth Houghton and Jill Tahourdin)

As Pamela Kent
(* Novels reedited as Ida Pollock)

Single novels
Moon over Africa*, 1955
Desert Doorway, 1956
City of Palms, 1957
Sweet Barbary, 1957
Meet Me in Istanbul*, 1958
Dawn on the High Mountain, 1959
Flight to the Stars, 1959
The Chateau of Fire    1961
Bladon's Rock = Doctor Gaston, 1963
The Dawning Splendour, 1963
Enemy Lover    1964
Gideon Faber's Chance* = Gideon Faber's Choice, 1965
Star Creek, 1965
The Gardenia Tree, 1965
Cuckoo in the Night, 1966
White Heat, 1966
Beloved Enemies, 1967
The Man Who Came Back, 1967
Desert Gold, 1968
Man from the Sea, 1968
Nile Dusk, 1972/12
Night of Stars, 1975/12

Anthologies in collaboration
Golden Harlequin Library Vol. VIII: Choose The One You'll Marry / Sweet Barbary / Senior Surgeon at St. David's (1970) (with  Mary Burchell and Elizabeth Gilzean)

As Averil Ives

Single novels
Haven of the Heart, 1956
The Secret Heart, 1956
Doctor's Desire = Desire for the Star, 1957
The Uncertain Glory = Nurse Linnet's Release, 1957
Island in the Dawn, 1958
Love in Sunlight = Nurse for the Doctor, 1958
Master of Hearts, 1959

Omnibus collections
Island in the Dawn / Fox and His Vixen, 1975

As Anita Charles

Single novels
The Black Benedicts, 1956
My Heart at Your Feet, 1957
One Coin in the Fountain, 1957
Interlude for Love, 1958
The Moon and Bride's Hill, 1958
Autumn Wedding, 1962
The King of the Castle, 1963
White Rose of Love, 1963

As Barbara Rowan

Single novels
Silver Fire = In Care of the Doctor, 1956
Flower for a Bride, 1957
Love is Forever, 1957
Mountain of Dreams, 1958
The Keys of the Castle, 1959
House of Sand, 1986/08

Anthologies in collaboration
Golden Harlequin Library Vol. XXXIII: Flower for a Bride / Bachelors Galore / Hope for the Doctor (1970) (with Essie Summers and Margaret Malcolm)
Tuesday's Jillaroo / Fires of Toretta / The Keys of the Castle (1985) (with Kerry Allyne and Iris Danbury)

As Jane Beaufort

Single novels
A Nightingale in the Sycamore, 1957
Dangerous Lover = Dangerous Love, 1959
Love in High Places, 1960
A Quest for Lovers, 1963
Interlude in Snow, 1964

As Rose Burghley

Single novels
 (* Novels reedited as Susan Barrie)

And Be Thy Love, 1958
Love in the Afternoon, 1959
The Sweet Surrender, 1959
Bride by Arrangement, 1960
A Moment in Paris, 1961
Highland Mist, 1962
The Garden of Don Jose*, 1965/06
Man of Destiny, 1965/10
A Quality of Magic, 1966
The Afterglow = Alpine Doctor, 1966
Bride of Alaine, 1966/10
Folly of the Heart, 1967/04
The Bay of Moonlight, 1968/01
Return to Tremarth*, 1969/08

Anthologies in collaboration
Golden Harlequin Library Vol. XXV: And be Thy Love / Doctor Memsahib / Black Charles (1962) (with Juliet Shore and Esther Wyndham)

As Mary Whistler

Single novels
Enchanted Autumn, 1959
Escape to Happiness, 1960
Sunshine Yellow, 1961
Pathway of Roses, 1962
The Young Nightingales, 1967

As Ida Pollock

Single novels
The Gentle Masquerade, 1964
The Uneasy Alliance, 1965
Lady in danger, 1967
Summer Conspiracy    1969/02
Country Air, 1970/08

Timeline Series
Sir Faintheart, 2015/04

Non fiction
Starlight, 2009

As Marguerite Bell
(* Novels reedited as Ida Pollock)

Single novels
A Rose for Danger*, 1977/05
The Devil's Daughter*    1978/07
Bride by Auction, 1989/11
Sea Change    2002/07
A Distant Drum, 2005/01

Anthologies in collaboration
The Runaways / Eleanor and the Marquis / A Rose for Danger / The Secret of Val Verde (1977) (with Jane Wilby, Judith Polley and Julia Herbert)
Eleanor and the Marquis / The Runaways / A Rose for Danger / Puritan Wife (1977) (with Jane Wilby, Judith Polley and Elizabeth De Guise)

References and sources 

1908 births
2013 deaths
English centenarians
English romantic fiction writers
English women novelists
20th-century English painters
21st-century English painters
Women romantic fiction writers
20th-century English novelists
20th-century English women writers
Women centenarians
21st-century English women